Kleinia petraea is a species of flowering plant in the genus Kleinia and family Asteraceae which was previously considered to be a species of Senecio. Native to Kenya and Tanzania, it is colloquially known as creeping jade, trailing jade or weeping jade due to its resemblance to the unrelated Jade plant (Crassula ovata). It is grown as a garden plant as a groundcover or in hanging baskets.

References

External links

petraea
Flora of East Tropical Africa
Flora of Kenya
Flora of Tanzania